Trichodesmium, also called sea sawdust, is a genus of filamentous cyanobacteria. They are found in nutrient poor tropical and subtropical ocean waters (particularly around Australia and in the Red Sea, where they were first described by Captain Cook). Trichodesmium is a diazotroph; that is, it fixes atmospheric nitrogen into ammonium, a nutrient used by other organisms. Trichodesmium is thought to fix nitrogen on such a scale that it accounts for almost half of the nitrogen fixation in marine systems globally. Trichodesmium is the only known diazotroph able to fix nitrogen in daylight under aerobic conditions without the use of heterocysts.

Trichodesmium can live as individual filaments, with tens to hundreds of cells strung together, or in colonies consisting of tens to hundreds of filaments clustered together. These colonies are visible to the naked eye and sometimes form blooms, which can be extensive on surface waters. These large blooms led to widespread recognition as "sea sawdust/straw"; in fact, the Red Sea gets most of its eponymous colouration from the corresponding pigment in Trichodesmium erythraeum. Colonies of Trichodesmium provide a pseudobenthic substrate for many small oceanic organisms including bacteria, diatoms, dinoflagellates, protozoa, and copepods (which are its primary predator); in this way, the genus can support complex microenvironments.

Species
Trichodesmium erythraeum – described by Ehrenberg in 1830. T. erythraeum is the species responsible for discoloring the Red Sea during blooms. This is the only sequenced genome in the genus thus far and is the focus of most laboratory studies (Trichodesmium IMS 101).

Trichodesmium thiebautii – Described by Gomont in 1892.

Trichodesmium hildebrantii – Described by Gomont in 1892.

Trichodesmium contortum – Described by Wille in 1904.

Trichodesmium tenue – Described by Wille in 1904.

Trichodesmium radians – Described by Wille in 1904.

Cell structure
Like most cyanobacteria, Trichodesmium has a gram negative cell wall.  However, unlike other aerobic diazotrophs, heterocysts (structures found in cyanobacteria which protect nitrogenase from oxygenation) are lacking in Trichodesmium. This is a unique characteristic among aerobic diazotrophs which fix nitrogen in daylight. Photosynthesis occurs using phycoerythrin - light-harvesting phycobiliprotein which is normally found within heterocysts in other diazotrophs.

Instead of having localized stacks of thylakoids, Trichodesmium has unstacked thylakoids found throughout the cell. Trichodesmium is highly vacuolated and the content and size of the vacuoles shows diurnal variation. Large gas vesicles (either along the periphery as seen in T. erythaeum or found distributed throughout the cell as seen in T. thiebautii) allow Trichodesmium to regulate buoyancy in the water column. These gas vesicles can withstand high pressure, presumably those up to 100 – 200 m in the water column, allowing Trichodesmium to move vertically through the water column harvesting nutrients.

Nitrogen-fixation
N2 is the most abundant chemical in the atmosphere. However, diatomic nitrogen is not usable for most biological processes. Nitrogen fixation is the process of converting atmospheric diatomic nitrogen into biologically usable forms of nitrogen such as ammonium and nitrogen oxides. This process requires a substantial amount of energy (in the form of ATP) in order to break the triple bond between the nitrogen atoms.

Trichodesmium  is the major diazotroph in marine pelagic systems and is an important source of "new" nitrogen in the nutrient poor waters it inhabits. It has been estimated that the global input of nitrogen fixation by Trichodesmium is approximately 60-80 Tg (megatonnes or 1012 grams) N per year. Nitrogen fixation in Trichodesmium is unique among diazotrophs because the process occurs concurrently with oxygen production (via photosynthesis). In other cyanobacteria, N2 and CO2 reduction are separated either in space (using heterocysts to protect the sensitive nitrogenase enzyme from oxygen) or time. However, Trichodesmium lacks heterocysts and nitrogen fixation peaks during daylight hours (following a diel flux initiated in the morning, reaching a maximum fixation rate midday, and ceasing activity at night). Since the first realization of this enigma, Trichodesmium has been the focus of many studies to try and discover how nitrogen fixation is able to occur in the presence of oxygen production without any apparent structure separating the two processes.

Inhibitor studies even revealed that photosystem II activity is essential for nitrogen fixation in this organism. All this may seem contradictory at first glance, because the enzyme responsible for nitrogen fixation, nitrogenase, is irreversibly inhibited by oxygen. However, Trichodesmium utilises photosynthesis for nitrogen fixation by carrying out the Mehler reaction, during which the oxygen produced by PSII is reduced again after PSI. This regulation of photosynthesis for nitrogen fixation involves rapidly reversible coupling of their light-harvesting antenna, the phycobilisomes, with PSI and PSII.

Ecology

Trichodesmium is found in oligotrophic waters, often when waters are calm and the mixed layer depth is shallow (around 100 m).
Trichodesmium is found primarily in water between 20 and 34 °C and is frequently encountered in tropical and sub-tropical oceans in western boundary currents. Its presence is more pronounced in nitrogen poor water and can easily be seen when blooms form, trapping large Trichodesmium colonies at the surface.

As a diazotroph, Trichodesmium contributes a large portion of the marine ecosystem’s new nitrogen, estimated to produce between 60 and 80 Tg of nitrogen per year. Nitrogen fixed by Trichodesmium can either be used directly by the cell, enter the food chain through grazers, be released into dissolved pools, or get exported to the deep sea.

Compared to eukaryotic phytoplankton, Trichodesmium has a slow growth rate, which has been hypothesized to be an adaptation to survival in high energy but low nutrient conditions of oligotrophic waters. Growth rate is limited by iron and phosphate concentrations in the water. In order to obtain these limiting nutrients, Trichodesmium is able to regulate buoyancy using its gas vacuole and move vertically throughout the water column, harvesting nutrients.

Colonies
Various species of Trichodesmium have been described based on morphology and structure of colonies formed. Colonies may consist of aggregates of several to several hundred trichomes and form fusiform (called "Tufts") colonies when aligned in parallel, or spherical (called "Puffs") colonies when aligned radially.

Trichodesmium colonies have been shown to have large degree of associations with other organisms, including bacteria, fungi, diatoms, copepods, tunicates, hydrozoans, and protozoans among other groups. These colonies may provide a source of shelter, buoyancy, and possibly food in the surface waters. Most of these associations appear to be commensal, with the Trichodesmium providing substrate and nutrition while deriving no obvious benefit from the organisms dwelling within the colonies.

Blooms
Trichodesmium forms large, visible blooms in the surface waters. Blooms have been described in the Baltic Sea, the Red Sea, the Caribbean Sea, the Indian Ocean, the North and South Atlantic and the North Pacific, and off the coast of Australia. One of the earliest blooms was described by E. Dupont in the Red Sea, noticed for turning the surface of the water a reddish color. This bloom was said to extend about 256 nautical miles. Most blooms are several kilometers long and last one to several months. Blooms can form in coastal or oceanic waters, most frequently when the water has been still for some time and surface temperatures exceed 27 °C.

Trichodesmium blooms release carbon, nitrogen and other nutrients into the environment. Some species of Trichodesmium have been shown to release toxins which cause mortalities in some copepods, fish, and oysters. Blooms have also been credited with releasing the toxin which causes clupeotoxism in humans after ingesting fish which have bioaccumulated the toxin during Trichodesmium blooms. The larger impact of these blooms is likely important to the oceanic ecosystem and is the source of many studies. Blooms are traced and tracked using satellite imaging where the highly reflective gas vacuole makes Trichodesmium blooms easily detectable.

It is expected that blooms may increase due to anthropogenic effects in the coming years. Phosphate loading of the environment (through fertilizer pollution, waste disposal, and mariculture) will reduce the growth constraints associated with limited phosphate and likely increase bloom occurrences. Likewise, global warming is projected to increase stratification and cause a shallowing of the mixed layer depth. Both of these factors are associated with Trichodesmium blooms and may also cause an increase in the occurrence of blooms in the future.

References

Bibliography
 Kana, T.M. (1993) Rapid oxygen cycling in Trichodesmium thiebautii. Limnology and Oceanography 38: 18–24.
 Berman-Frank, I., Lundgren, P., Chen, Y.-B., Küpper, H., Kolber, Z., Bergman, B., and Falkowski, P. (2001) Segregation of nitrogen fixation and oxygenic photosynthesis in the marine cyanobacterium Trichodesmium. Science 294: 1534–1537.
 Küpper, H., Ferimazova, N., Šetlík, I., and Berman-Frank, I. (2004) Traffic lights in Trichodesmium: regulation of photosynthesis for nitrogen fixation studied by chlorophyll fluorescence kinetic microscopy. Plant Physiology 135: 2120–2133.
 Capone, D.G., Zehr, J., Paerl, H., Bergman, B., and Carpenter, E.J. (1997) Trichodesmium: A globally significant marine cyanobacterium. Science 276: 1221–1229.

External links

Publications on Trichodesmium from a Marine Biogeochemistry laboratory at the University of Southern California
Charles Darwin's description of sailing through a Trichodesmium bloom
Trichodesmium in Florida — 2004, Florida Fish and Wildlife Conservation Commission Fish and Wildlife Research Institute 

Cyanobacteria genera
Oscillatoriales